Phthorimaea pherometopa is a moth in the family Gelechiidae. It was described by Povolný in 1967. It is found in Mexico.

References

Phthorimaea
Moths described in 1967